Randy Edwini-Bonsu (born April 20, 1990) is a Canadian soccer player who last played for FC Edmonton in the Canadian Premier League.

Club career

Early career
Edwini-Bonsu started playing soccer when his family immigrated from Ghana to Edmonton, Alberta in 2002. He played club soccer for the Green & Gold Soccer Club at the University of Alberta in Edmonton and, from 2004 and 2006, was a member of the Alberta provincial team, leading his province to a gold medal victory at the 2006 Canadian All-Star Championship.

At club level, Edwini-Bonsu played for Southwest United of the Edmonton Interdistrict Youth Soccer Association (EIYSA) between 2003 and 2006, and in his last year with the club he took Southwest United U-16's to an Alberta provincial title and a second-place finish at Canadian Club Championship in Moncton, New Brunswick.

In 2007, he trained with the U-18 and reserve sides of French club FC Metz.

Vancouver Whitecaps
Later in 2007 he signed with the youth academy of USL First Division side Vancouver Whitecaps. He played for Whitecaps' development team, Vancouver Whitecaps Residency, in the USL Premier Development League, helping the team to the Conference Finals in its inaugural season, scoring nine goals in 15 games along the way.

Following the conclusion of the 2008 PDL season, Edwini-Bonsu was called up to the senior Vancouver Whitecaps team, and made his professional debut on August 20, 2008, in a 0–0 tie with the Seattle Sounders.

AC Oulu
In 2011, Edwini-Bonsu played for Finnish Ykkönen side AC Oulu.

Eintracht Braunschweig
On November 22, 2011, it was announced that Edwini-Bonsu had signed a contract with Eintracht Braunschweig through June 2013, after impressing in two friendlies while on trial, scoring a total of four goals. Edwini-Bonsu made his debut in Germany on February 5, 2012, in a 2–1 defeat to Eintracht Frankfurt, he came on as a second half sub for Mathias Fetsch.

On March 4, 2012, Edwini-Bonsu made his home debut in a league game for Eintracht Braunschweig as a sub for Damir Vrančić (32nd minute). This substitution set the basics for Eintracht beating Hansa Rostock 3–2:  Edwini-Bonsu initiated an attack that led to Braunschweig's second goal. In minute 79, Edwini-Bonsu was fouled which led to the final result by a directly converted free-kick from Nico Zimmermann.

His good performance in this match got confirmed by Eintracht Braunschweig's fans who have voted him as the "Player of the Day". However, subsequently Edwini-Bonsu could not establish himself as a regular at the club, and his contract was not renewed at the end of the 2012–13 season.

Stuttgarter Kickers
After six months without a club, he signed for 3. Liga side Stuttgarter Kickers in January 2014.

VfR Aalen
After his contract had not been renewed, he moved to fellow leaguer VfR Aalen on June 30, 2015, signing a contract until 2017.

FC Edmonton
In November 2018, Edwini-Bonsu signed with Canadian Premier League club FC Edmonton. He made his debut for Edmonton on May 4 against Valour FC. On November 4, Edmonton announced Edwini-Bonsu would be leaving the club.

International career

Youth
On November 12, 2008, he was called to a Canada U-20 training camp in Switzerland. Edwini-Bonsu represented Canada at the 2007 CONCACAF U17 Tournament in Kingston, Jamaica; Canada finished fourth in Group B. Edwini-Bonsu was later called up to a U-20 camp for Canada in November 2008 which included an exhibition match against U-21 from Young Boys Bern on November 24 in Bern and then an international friendly match against Switzerland on November 26, 2008, in Solothurn. He tied for the goal-scoring lead with three goals in three games at the 2009 CONCACAF U-20 Championship even though Canada didn't advance past the group stage. In January 2010, he was called up for the U-23 of Canada alongside his teammate Philippe Davies.

Senior
On January 31, 2010, he earned his first cap for the Canada national men's soccer team in a friendly match against Jamaica. Edwini-Bonsu didn't return to Canada's senior team until March 22, 2013, when he received his second cap in a friendly against Japan. On June 27, 2013, Edwini-Bonsu was listed as a part of the confirmed 23-man squad for Colin Miller's Canada squad for 2013 CONCACAF Gold Cup. Edwini-Bonsu scored his first goal for Canada in a friendly against Puerto Rico on March 30, 2015.

Career statistics

Club

International

International goals
Scores and results list Canada's goal tally first.

References

External links
 
 

1990 births
Living people
Association football forwards
Canadian soccer players
Ghanaian footballers
Soccer players from Edmonton
Footballers from Kumasi
Ghanaian emigrants to Canada
Naturalized citizens of Canada
Black Canadian soccer players
Canadian expatriate soccer players
Ghanaian expatriate footballers
Expatriate footballers in Finland
Canadian expatriate sportspeople in Finland
Ghanaian expatriate sportspeople in Finland
Expatriate footballers in Germany
Canadian expatriate sportspeople in Germany
Ghanaian expatriate sportspeople in Germany
Vancouver Whitecaps Residency players
Vancouver Whitecaps (1986–2010) players
AC Oulu players
Eintracht Braunschweig players
Eintracht Braunschweig II players
Stuttgarter Kickers players
VfR Aalen players
FC 08 Homburg players
Tennis Borussia Berlin players
FC Edmonton players
USL League Two players
USL First Division players
USSF Division 2 Professional League players
Ykkönen players
2. Bundesliga players
Oberliga (football) players
3. Liga players
Regionalliga players
Canadian Premier League players
Canada men's youth international soccer players
Canada men's under-23 international soccer players
Canada men's international soccer players
2013 CONCACAF Gold Cup players